Roseovarius albus is a Gram-negative, aerobic and heterotrophic bacterium from the genus of Roseovarius which has been isolated from seawater from the Mediterranean Sea from Spain.

References

External links
Type strain of Roseovarius albus at BacDive -  the Bacterial Diversity Metadatabase

Rhodobacteraceae
Bacteria described in 2014